= Jacques Albert =

Canadian electrical engineer

Jacques Albert is a Canadian electrical engineer, currently a Canada Research Chair in Advanced Photonic Components at Carleton University and a Fellow of The Optical Society.
